Herrin may refer to:

 Herrin (surname)
 Herrin, Illinois, a city, United States
 Herrin, Nord, a commune of the Nord (département), in France
 Herrin massacre, a battle during a mining labor dispute in Herrin, Illinois